Valérie Batut (born 12 October 1969) is a French former professional tennis player.

Batut, a native of Gueugnon, reached a career high ranking of 243 while competing on the professional tour, with qualifying draw appearances to her name at the French Open and Wimbledon. She twice featured in the singles main draw of the Strasbourg WTA Tour tournament, where in 1990 she won her first round match over Jo-Anne Faull, who was at the time ranked in the world's top 100.

ITF finals

Singles: 2 (0–2)

References

External links
 
 

1969 births
Living people
French female tennis players
Sportspeople from Saône-et-Loire